

James Durbin FBA (30 June 1923 – 23 June 2012) was a British statistician and econometrician, known particularly for his work on time series analysis and serial correlation.

Education
The son of a greengrocer, Durbin was born in Widnes, where he attended the Wade Deacon Grammar School. He studied mathematics at St John's College, Cambridge, where his contemporaries included David Cox and Denis Sargan.  After wartime service in the Army Operational Research Group, he worked as a statistician for two years with the British Boot, Shoe and Allied Trades Research Association and took a postgraduate diploma in mathematical statistics at Cambridge, supervised by Henry Daniels.

Career
After two years at the department of applied economics in Cambridge, Durbin joined the London School of Economics in 1950 and was appointed professor of statistics in 1961, a post he held until his retirement in 1988.

Awards and honours
He served as president of the International Statistical Institute from 1983–1985, and as president of the Royal Statistical Society (RSS) from 1986–1987. In 2008 he was awarded the highest distinction of the RSS, the Guy Medal in Gold (having previously been awarded both the Silver and Bronze medals). The citation read: 
His last book, Time Series Analysis by State Space Methods, was published by Oxford University Press in May 2012. His last books were co-authored by Siem Jan Koopman of  VU University Amsterdam.
He died on 23 June 2012.

References

1923 births
2012 deaths
British statisticians
Fellows of the American Statistical Association
Presidents of the Royal Statistical Society
Presidents of the International Statistical Institute
Time series econometricians
Alumni of St John's College, Cambridge
Fellows of the British Academy
Academics of the London School of Economics
People from Wigan
People from Widnes
Fellows of the Econometric Society
Mathematical statisticians
Econometricians